"What Is Love?" is the second single by musician Howard Jones. Released in 1983, from the album Human's Lib, it reached no. 2 in the UK Singles Chart, becoming the singer's highest chart placing to date. In the US, it peaked at no. 33 on the Billboard Hot 100.

The song was originally entitled "Love?" on the demo tape (listing below) which Howard Jones recorded in 1982, which itself was available at his gigs. Jones also used the question mark motif around this time on posters advertising his gigs; posters which also hung behind him on stage at his early 1980s Marquee Club appearances and which read simply "Howard Jones?".

Background
Howard Jones said, "I didn't want to write songs about, 'I love you, baby, you've hurt me and I'm sad.' I didn't want to write songs about co-dependency. If I was going to write about love, I wanted to say what do we mean by love? What is it, really? You can't be dependent upon another person for your happiness. So you'd better question this idea of romantic love pretty soon, otherwise you're going to be pretty miserable. So that's really what that song is."

Music video
The music video to What Is Love? was filmed in Paris, France and features Jones walking around the city and a park.

Charts and certifications

Weekly charts

Year-end charts

Certifications

Track listing
7"
"What Is Love?" (Jones/Bryant) – 3:41
"It Just Doesn't Matter" (Jones/Bryant) – 3:36

12"
"What Is Love?" (Extended Version) (Jones/Bryant) – 6:33
"It Just Doesn't Matter" (Jones/Bryant) – 4:30
"Hunt The Self" (Live at the Marquee) (Jones/Bryant) – 5:36

Limited Edition 12"
A limited edition pack was also released featuring the standard 12-inch single and a "Live at the Marquee" bonus 7-inch single which featured the tracks:
"What Can I Say" (Jones/Bryant) – 5:10
"Bounce Right Back" (Jones) – 5:23

Demo Tape
"What Can I Say"
"Always Asking Questions"
"Human's Lib"
"Love?" (aka "What Is Love?")
"Risk"

References

External links
The Official Howard Jones Website Discography

1983 songs
1983 singles
1984 singles
Howard Jones (English musician) songs
Song recordings produced by Rupert Hine
Songs written by Howard Jones (English musician)
Warner Music Group singles